Valleve (Bergamasque:  or ) is a comune (municipality) in the Province of Bergamo in the Italian region of Lombardy, located about  northeast of Milan and about  north of Bergamo.

The municipality of Valleve contains the frazione (subdivision) San Simone.

Valleve borders the following municipalities: Branzi, Carona, Foppolo, Mezzoldo, Piazzatorre, Tartano.

Demographic evolution

References